Silvio Hector Oltra (born 26 February 26, 1958 – 15 March 1995) was an Argentine racing driver. He won the TC2000 championship in 1987.

Oltra was born in Buenos Aires, Argentina, on 26 February 1958. He died on March 15, 1995, while riding as a passenger in a Bell 206B-3 helicopter piloted by Carlos Menem, Jr., son of President of Argentina Carlos Menem. The helicopter reportedly struck overhead power lines while taking off at San Nicholas, Argentina, and crashed, killing both men.

References

1958 births
1995 deaths
Argentine racing drivers
Formula Renault Argentina drivers
Turismo Carretera drivers
TC 2000 Championship drivers
Victims of aviation accidents or incidents in Argentina
Victims of aviation accidents or incidents in 1995
Victims of helicopter accidents or incidents